Arrow in the Air is a 1957 British TV play based on the Cyprus Emergency, although Cyprus was fictionalised as "Solaro". It starred Nicholas Amer.

References

External links
Show details at Memorable TV

1957 television plays
British television plays